The 2003 Speedway World Cup Race-off was the fourth race of the 2003 Speedway World Cup season. It took place on August 7, 2003 in Outrup, Denmark.

Results

Heat details

References

See also 
 2003 Speedway World Cup
 motorcycle speedway

R